Konstantinos Skourletis (died 1888) was a Greek politician and a mayor of Patras.

He became a mayor of the city from 1844 until 1851.  In 1847 due to the situation at the time, he replaced Antonios Antonopoulos as mayor of the city, as the former was a royalist and the latter an anti-royalist.  He managed the trade crisis successfully.  He died in 1888.

References
The first version of the article is translated and is based from the article at the Greek Wikipedia (el:Main Page)

1888 deaths
Mayors of Patras
Year of birth missing